Paola Andrea Rey Arciniegas (born December 19, 1979, in  San Gil, Santander, Colombia) is a Colombian actress and model.

Biography 
Paola Andrea Rey Arciniegas  was born on December 19, 1979 in San Gil, Santander, Colombia. She is the daughter of José Domingo Rey and Cecilia Arciniegas. Paola has two siblings -  a sister, Alexandra Rey Arciniegas and a brother, José Alberto Rey Arciniegas. Initially, she was interested in pursuing Industrial engineering. However, she let go of her pursuit after being cast in a telenovela in 1996, with no previous acting experience. .

Personal life 
On June 5, 2010, she married the Colombian actor Juan Carlos Vargas. In July 2013, she gave birth to the couple's first child - a boy, named Oliver Vargas Rey. In May 2018, she gave birth to a second son, called Leo Vargas Rey. 

Rey is close friends with the Colombian actor, Juan Alfonso Baptista.

Career 
She has worked in a number of  Colombian telenovelas, including La Baby Sister, Pasión de Gavilanes, and La mujer en el espejo.<ref>Morales, Magaly "Magic Mirror's on the wall", South Florida Sun-Sentinel" (November 29, 2004) p 3E</ref>

She has appeared in several films, including Como el gato y el raton, which won awards in several international festivals, and The Private Archives of Pablo Escobar''.

She also works as a model, appearing on the cover of the Fall 2005 edition of "Fuego", and has been the face of Neutrogena.

Filmography

Television

Movies

References

External links

1979 births
Colombian telenovela actresses
Living people
20th-century Colombian actresses
21st-century Colombian actresses
Colombian film actresses
Colombian female models